The IPSC Rifle World Shoot is the highest level rifle match within the International Practical Shooting Confederation (IPSC) which consists of several days and at least 30 separate courses of fire. The Rifle World Shoots are held triennially on a rotational cycle with the other two main IPSC disciplines Handgun and Shotgun.

History 
The first Rifle World Shoot was originally scheduled to be held in 2006 in Denmark, but was postponed and later cancelled due to difficulty in arranging enough long range stages. South Africa later expressed interest in hosting the event, but did not put forward a bid. In 2009 Norway hosted the first European Rifle Championship with most of the top competitors from America, Europe and the rest of the world present. Norway afterwards intended to bid for hosting the first Rifle World Shoot in 2013, but had to withdraw the bid due to financial reasons and lack of facilities. Russia then successfully bid in 2013 to host the first IPSC Rifle World Shoot in 2016, and planned to hold the competition at the newly constructed shooting range in Patriot Park near Moscow, an ideal range for such a large competition. In order to finish the construction of the new shooting range IPSC approved to reschedule the inaugural championship to 2017. The first IPSC Rifle Championship was therefore held in June 2017. The second IPSC Rifle World Shoot has been awarded to Sweden, and was hosted in Karlskoga during August 2019.

List of Rifle World Shoots 
The following is a list of previous and future World Shoots:
 2017 Rifle World Shoot, at the Patriot Park, Moscow, Russia.
 2019 Rifle World Shoot, in Karlskoga, Sweden.
 2024 Rifle World Shoot, in Liminka, Finland

Individual Champions

Overall category

Lady category

Junior category

Senior category

Super Senior category

Teams

Overall teams

Lady teams

Senior teams

See also 
 IPSC Handgun World Shoots
 IPSC Shotgun World Shoots
 IPSC Action Air World Shoots
 List of world sports championships

References

External links 
 Video from the Opening ceremony - 2017 IPSC Rifle World Shoot
 Video from the Shoot Off Side Event- 2017 IPSC Rifle World Shoot